Andrew Heringer (born November 28, 1984) is an American musician, singer-songwriter, composer, music-producer, music-mixer, theater collaborator and performer.

Milo Greene
In 2009, Heringer started writing and recording music that eventually became the debut album by Milo Greene with bandmates Marlana Sheetz and Robbie Arnett.  Most of the debut Milo Greene was recorded on Heringer's laptop and mobile recording gear  at the homes and cabins of friends and family. The band choose to finish off recording at Bear Creek Studios in Woodinville, WA with producer Ryan Hadlock.

From 2012 to 2015 while Heringer was in the band, Milo Greene released two albums - Milo Greene and Control. Milo Greene was released on July 17, 2012, and peaked at number 1 on the US Billboard Heatseekers Albums and number 115 on the Billboard 200 albums chart.

They appeared on multiple late night television shows including Late Night With David Letterman, The Tonight Show with Jay Leno and two appearances on Conan. On the touring front, they opened for The Civil Wars, Foster The People,  Bombay Bicycle Club, Cold War Kids,  Stars (Canadian band), and The Walkmen, and toured with Lucius, Bahamas, Kopecky and Family of the Year. Their music has been featured in TV shows such as Grey’s Anatomy, Supernatural, Hart of Dixie, and Nikita as well as in the films Big Eyes and Fun Size.

In 2013, Heringer collaborated with Damien Rice and provided backing vocals for Damien’s album My Favourite Faded Fantasy as well as for songs for the soundtrack of The Prophet.

On December 17, 2015, Heringer announced on his social media that he would be parting ways with Milo Greene to pursue his own projects as well as write, produce and mix with other artists.

The Guest and The Host

The Guest and The Host is Heringer's solo indie folk project recorded primarily at his Beachwood Canyon cabin he calls Mirror Wall Studio. Buzzbands.LA wrote "Heringer’s work as the Guest and the Host finds its heartbeat in the ’70s-style folk-rock of his former band’s [ Milo Greene ] first album."

In February 2018, Heringer released his first E.P. under The Guest and The Host called "You're Exactly Where You're Supposed to Be" - a collection of 6 songs; many of which had been previously released as singles.

A number of The Guest and the Host songs have been featured in television shows such as "Looking Out For You" iZombie (TV series), "Love and Laughter" on Kevin (Probably) Saves the World, "Best Friend" on Whiskey Cavalier and "You Bring Me Joy" on Jane The Virgin.

Dawson Records
Heringer has started to release music under his own label, Dawson Records, for his project The Guest and the Host as well as his collaborations with Madi Sipes and The Painted Blue and other artists he works with out of his studio.

George Harrison Tribute Album
On February 25, 2020, Heringer released "Let Me Into Your Heart : A Tribute To George Harrison." The album consisted of 17 tracks written or recorded by Harrison from his solo albums as well as his time with The Beatles and The Traveling Wilburys. The album was released on what would have been Harrison's 77th birthday. The album featured performances by many of Heringer's frequent collaborators - Madi Diaz, Geographer (Band), Paul McDonald (musician), Cary Brothers, Avid Dancer, Zach of Rogue Wave (band) and Clara-Nova.

Discography

Television and Movie Placements 
 Grey's Anatomy
 Milo Greene · "1957" (S9 · E7 · I Was Made For Lovin' You · 29 Nov 2012)
 Milo Greene · "Don't You Give Up On Me" (S8 · E22 · Let the Bad Times Roll · 3 May 2012)
 Madi Diaz · "The One That You Want" (S13 · E22 · Leave It Inside · 4 May 2017)
 Congratulationz · "Keep Breathing" (S14 · E7 · Who Lives, Who Dies, Who Tells Your Story · 9 Nov 2017)
 Congratulationz feat. CanvasBeta · "They" (S14 · E7 · Who Lives, Who Dies, Who Tells Your Story · 9 Nov 2017)
 13 Reasons Why
 Jens Kuross · "Spiraling" (Official Trailer - Final Season)
 Jane The Virgin
 The Guest and the Host · "You Bring Me Joy" ("S5 · E4 · Chapter Eighty-Five · 17 Apr 2019")
 Lucifer
 Jens Kuross · "Spiraling" (S3 · E4 · What Would Lucifer Do? · 23 Oct 2017)
 Congratulationz feat. Valerie Broussard "Devil In Your Eyes" (S3 · E5 · Welcome Back, Charlotte Richards · 30 Oct 2017)
 Shameless
 Congratulationz · "Whatever We Like" (S9 E5 · Black Haired Ginger · 7 Oct 2018)
 Congratulationz · "Wild Woman #Boss " (S10 E11 · Location, Location, Location · 19 Jan 2020)
 Big Eyes
 Milo Greene · "Perfectly Aligned" (Theatrical Trailer)
 iZombie
 Milo Greene · "Royal Blue" (S1 · E10 · Mr. Berserk · 19 May 2015)
 The Guest and The Host · "Looking Out For You" (S3 · E8 · Eat a Knievel · 23 May 2017)
 Madi Sipes & The Painted Blue · "Blue Jean Baby" (S3 · E12 · Looking for Mr. Goodbrain (1) · 20 Jun 2017)
 Congratulationz · "Why Can't We Be Friends" (S4 · E4 · Brainless in Seattle (2) · 19 Mar 2018)
 Hart of Dixie
 Milo Greene · "Silent Way" (S2 · E1 · I Fall To Pieces · 2 Oct 2012)
 Milo Greene · "Take A Step" (S2 · E6 · I Walk The Line · 13 Nov 2012)
 Milo Greene · "What's The Matter" (S2 · E8 · Achy Breaky Hearts · 27 Nov 2012)
 Suburgatory
 Milo Greene · "1957" (S1 · E22 · The Motherload · 16 May 2012)
 Milo Greene · "Cutty Love" (S2 · E3 · Ryan's Song · 31 Oct 2012)
 Fun Size
 Milo Greene · "Autumn Tree"
 Atypical
 Milo Greene · "Cutty Love" (S1 · E1 · Antarctica · 11 Aug 2017)
 Covert Affairs
 Milo Greene · "Cutty Love" (S3 · E9 · Suffragette City · 11 Sep 2012)
 Reign
 Milo Greene · "Don't You Give Up On Me" (S1 · E5 · A Chill in the Air · 14 Nov 2013)
 Nikita
 Milo Greene · "Perfectly Aligned" (S3 · E1 · 3.0 · 19 Oct 2012)
 Arrow
 Milo Greene · "Son My Son" (S2 · E12 · Tremors · 29 Jan 2014)
 Kevin (Probably) Saves the World
 The Guest and the Host · "Love and Laughter" (S1 · E3 · Sweet Little Lies 17 Oct 2017)
 Good Trouble
 Rivvrs · "My Enemy" (S2 · E8 · Disruptions · 6 Aug 2019)
 Congratulationz · "My Enemy" (S2 · E15 · 12 Feb 2020)
 Elementary
 Chase McBride · "Find A Home" (S7 · E7 · From Russia with Drugs · 4 Jul 2019)
 Siren
 Colyer · "Enough" (S2 · E10 · All In · 20 Jun 2019)
 Lethal Weapon
 youthxx feat. Congratulationz · "Outlaw" (S2 · E17 · The Odd Couple · 6 Mar 2018)
 Supernatural
 Milo Greene · "What's The Matter" (S8 · E4 · Bitten · 24 Oct 2012)
 Mary Kills People
 Jens Kuross · "Spiraling" (S3 · E5 · Wolf, Meet Henhouse · 9 Jun 2019)
 The Blacklist
 Vision Vision feat. Congratulationz · "Hard Times" (S6 · E2 · The Corsican · 4 Jan 2019)
 The Resident
 Jafar · "Mood Of Water" (S2 · E18 · Emergency Contact · 25 Mar 2019)
 Catfish
 Jafar · "Mood Of Water" (S8 · E3 · 21 Jan 2020)
 Whiskey Cavalier
 The Guest and the Host · "Best Friend" (S1 · E5 · The English Job · 27 Mar 2019)
 Grand Hotel
 morgxn · "Hard Pill To Swallow" (S1 · E8 · Long Night's Journey Into Day" · 5 Aug 2019)
 Dynasty
 morgxn · "Notorious" (S1 · E2 · Spit It Out · 18 Oct 2017)
 Notorious
 morgxn · "Notorious" (S1 · E1 · Pilot · 22 Sep 2016)
 The Red Line
 Jon Bryant · "At Home" (S1 · E4 · We Need Glory for a While · 5 May 2019)
 NCIS
 Jon Bryant · "At Home" (S15 · E21 · One Step Forward · 1 May 2018)
 Shades of Blue 
 Claire Guerreso · "No Doubt" (S3 · E2 · The Hollow Crown · 24 Jun 2018 Promo)
 Shadowhunters: The Mortal Instruments
 Proper Gentlemen feat. Mr Gabriel · "Stronger" (S2 · E17 · A Dark Reflection · 24 Jul 2017)

References

Living people
1984 births
American male singer-songwriters
American male composers
21st-century American composers
Musicians from Sacramento, California
Singer-songwriters from California
21st-century American singers
21st-century American male singers